W. Stuart Helm (April 8, 1908 – March 2, 1986) was an American politician who was Speaker of the Pennsylvania House of Representatives.  He attended Kittanning High School, Pennsylvania State College, and Duquesne University.  He was employed by the Sun Oil Company and served on the Kittanning Borough School Board from 1937 to 1942.

Helm was elected to the Pennsylvania House of Representatives in 1940 and served through 1964..  He served from Speaker from 1957-1958 and again from 1963-1964. Helm served as Secretary of the Commonwealth from 1965 until 1967 under Governor William Scranton.

References

Speakers of the Pennsylvania House of Representatives
Republican Party members of the Pennsylvania House of Representatives
1908 births
20th-century American politicians
People from Armstrong County, Pennsylvania
1986 deaths